Vandiny trampoty is a 1938 Czechoslovak comedy film, directed by Miroslav Cikán. It stars Věra Ferbasová, Theodor Pištěk, and Jiří Dohnal.

References

External links
Vandiny trampoty at the Internet Movie Database

1938 films
Czechoslovak comedy films
1938 comedy films
Films directed by Miroslav Cikán
Czechoslovak black-and-white films
1930s Czech films